Martin P. Wattenberg is a political scientist at the University of California, Irvine. He is an expert on American elections and party politics and is co-author of a popular undergraduate college text on American government, Government in America: People, Policy, and Politics, published by Pearson Longman. He is also the author of Where Have All the Voters Gone: The Decline of American Political Parties, Is Voting For Young People?, The Rise of Candidate-Centered Politics, and "Obama: Year One".

Wattenberg and his wife appear in Season 9 of the reality television show Flipping Out as the owners of a Newport Beach home which is undergoing a design renovation.

Publications
Is Voting for Young People? Longman, 2007.
Where Have All the Voters Gone? Harvard University Press, 2002.
Parties Without Partisans: Political Change in Advanced Industrialized Societies (co-edited with Russell Dalton). Oxford University Press, 2000. 
Mixed-Member Electoral Systems: The Best of Both Worlds? (co-edited with Matthew Shugart). Oxford University Press, 2000.
The Decline of American Political Parties, (sixth edition). Harvard University Press, 1998. 
The Rise of Candidate-Centered Politics: Presidential Elections of the 1980s. Harvard University Press, 1991.

References

University of California, Irvine faculty
Wattenberg, Martin (political scientist)
Year of birth missing (living people)
Place of birth missing (living people)
American political scientists